Toyota Canada may refer to:

 Toyota Canada Inc., distributor
 Toyota Motor Manufacturing Canada, manufacturer